Lycopodolica is a genus of extinct plants of the Late Silurian (around ). Fossils were found in the Rashkov Beds in Podolia in modern Ukraine. Plants there are preserved as compressions without internal detail. Lycopodolica had stems (axes) which appear to have branched and which are covered with lax, hair- or thread-like outgrowths. Considered to be a lycophyte, Lycopodolica differs from Baragwanathia in the nature of its outgrowths or enations. It was listed as a lycopsid by Hao and Xue in 2013.

References

Silurian plants
Prehistoric lycophytes
Prehistoric lycophyte genera